Osgood is an unincorporated community in Walnut Township, Palo Alto County, Iowa, United States.

History
Founded in the 1800s, Osgood's population was 22 in 1902, and 80 in 1925.

References

Unincorporated communities in Palo Alto County, Iowa
Unincorporated communities in Iowa